The Pigeon is a 1969 American made-for-television crime drama film starring Sammy Davis Jr. It was directed by Earl Bellamy. It was originally aired as the ABC Movie of the Week on November 4, 1969.

Plot
A private eye is hired to protect a young girl.

Cast
Sammy Davis Jr. as Larry Miller
Dorothy Malone as Elaine Hagen
Victoria Vetri as Barbara Hagen
Ricardo Montalbán as John Stambler / Kane
Pat Boone as Dave Williams
Roy Glenn as Lieutenant Frank Miller
Patsy Kelly as Mrs. Macready, the Landlady
Norman Alden as Carl, the First Thug
Bennie Dobbins as Eddie, the Second Thug (as Bernie Dobbins)
Bill Quinn as Doctor
Judith Jordan as Sarah
Francis De Sales as Caine

Production
Davis developed the concept with Aaron Spelling and hoped it would lead to a TV series.

Boone says he was surprised to be offered a role in the film.

Davis was unsatisfied with the movie saying "let's say I hit a triple when I was going for a homer... We played him [my character] a little too straight." However no series resulted.

References

External links

The Pigeon at Thrilling Detective

1969 television films
1969 films
1969 crime drama films
American crime drama films
ABC Movie of the Week
American detective films
Films directed by Earl Bellamy
Films scored by Billy May
1960s American films